Bill Clements (1917–2011) was Governor of Texas.

William Clements may also refer to:
 William Clements (Baltimore MP) (1733–1770), Irish politician, MP for Baltimore 1761–1768
Bill Clements (American football), American football player and coach
Bill Clements (footballer), Australian rules footballer 
William Clements, 3rd Earl of Leitrim (1806–1878), Anglo-Irish nobleman
William L. Clements (1861–1934), American book and manuscript collector 
William Clements High School in Texas, established in 1983

See also
William Clemens (disambiguation)
William Clement (disambiguation)